Mark Morris (born March 31, 1958) is an American former professional ice hockey defenseman. He was the head coach of St. Lawrence from 2016-2019, succeeding Greg Carvel who departed for UMass.

Career
Morris played four seasons (1981 – 1984) of professional hockey, mostly with the New Haven Nighthawks of the American Hockey League (AHL), where he scored 9 goals and 33 assists for 42 points, with 146 penalty minutes, in 156 AHL games played.

Following his playing career, Morris turned to coaching and found his way to Clarkson. He became the Golden Knights most successful coach winning more games, regular season titles, tournament titles and reaching more NCAA tournaments than anyone in school history.

In November 2002, Morris was fired three games into the 2002-03 season following an on-ice incident with one of his own players. Clarkson president Denny Brown said that in light of both the incident and Morris' refusal to take part in an internal investigation that had taken place, Clarkson had no choice but to fire Morris immediately.

In professional hockey, Morris began his professional coaching career under Marc Crawford, serving from February 2003 to April 2003 as the Special Assistant Coach/Interim Strength and Conditioning Coach for the Vancouver Canucks of the NHL. Then, after a two-year stint at a prep school in Lake Placid, Morris landed a job with the Manchester Monarchs of the American Hockey League in 2006. He spent eight years as head coach, compiling a record of 339-223-67, making him the only coach in history with over 300 wins in both the college and professional ranks.

In 2016 Morris returned to the college game, taking over at St. Lawrence, which is less than 10 miles from Clarkson University, and attempted to try and continue the success he had in the 1990s. After a good first season Morris found himself mired in an NCAA investigation that alleged multiple serious rules violations but after three months he was cleared on all but one minor infraction. In his third season Morris posted the second-worst record in program history, including the most losses for any Saints team, and was unsurprisingly fired at the end of the postseason.

Head coaching record

College

† Morris was fired mid-season

References

https://www.seattletimes.com/sports/college-hockey-coach-mark-morris-one-of-a-kind/

External links

1958 births
Living people
American ice hockey coaches
American men's ice hockey defensemen
Clarkson Golden Knights men's ice hockey coaches
Colgate Raiders men's ice hockey players
Dallas Black Hawks players
Florida Panthers coaches
High school ice hockey coaches in the United States
New Haven Nighthawks players
People from Massena, New York
St. Lawrence Saints men's ice hockey coaches
Union Dutchmen ice hockey coaches
Vancouver Canucks coaches